The 1965 Carnegie Tech Tartans football team represented the Carnegie Institute of Technology—now known as Carnegie Mellon University—as an independent during the 1965 NCAA College Division football season. Led by fourth-year head coach Joe Gasparella the Tartans compiled a record of 1–7.

References

Carnegie Tech
Carnegie Mellon Tartans football seasons
Carnegie Tech Tartans football